Pliopedia pacifica is an extinct species of walrus found in what is now Central Valley, California, United States, which lived during the late Miocene. It was an amphibious carnivore.

Discovery 
The holotype specimen (USNM 13627) was collected in 1909 by Robert Anderson, and consists of pieces of both forelimbs.

Known Pliopedia fossils include a humerus, pieces of radius and ulna from both forelimbs, metacarpals, metatarsals, and phalanges. They were discovered in the Paso Robles Formation of San Luis Obispo County, California.

References

Miocene pinnipeds
Prehistoric carnivoran genera
Prehistoric pinnipeds of North America
Odobenids
Fossil taxa described in 1921